Kamal Passi is an Indian cricketer. He performed exceptionally well against Zimbabwe in the 2012 under-19 Cricket World Cup. He made his first class debut for Services on 7 November 2015 in the 2015–16 Ranji Trophy.

On 14 August 2012 Kamal Passi took 6 wickets for 23 runs and made 24 runs off just five balls with a four and three sixes against Zimbabwe in a group stage match.

References

External links
bcci.tv

1992 births
Living people
Indian cricketers
Services cricketers